Tayside North may refer to:
 North Tayside (UK Parliament constituency) - UK Parliamentary constituency from 1983 to 2005
 North Tayside (Scottish Parliament constituency) - Scottish Parliament constituency covering the same area, from 1999.